Ruins are the remains of man-made architecture.

Ruins or ruin may refer to:

History
The Ruin (Ukrainian history), a period in Ukrainian history after the death of Bohdan Khmelnytsky in 1657

Geography
Ruin, Iran, a village in North Khorasan Province, Iran
Ruin Rural District, an administrative subdivision of North Khorasan Province, Iran
The Ruins (mansion), an old mansion and tourist attraction in Talisay City, Negros Occidental, Philippines

Arts, entertainment, and media

Films
Ruins, a 1967 independent film by Clarke Mackey
Ruins (film), a 2004 Slovenian film
The Ruins (film), a 2008 horror film based on the 2006 novel of the same name

Television
 "Ruin" (Gotham), an episode of Gotham
Real World/Road Rules Challenge: The Ruins, 18th season of The Challenge
 "The Ruins", an episode of Voltron: Legendary Defender

Literature
Ruins (novel), a 2012 novel from the Pathfinder series by Orson Scott Card
"The Ruin", an 8th century Anglo-Saxon poem
"The Ruin (Dafydd ap Gwilym poem)", a 14th-century Welsh poem
The Ruins (novel), a 2006 horror novel set in the Yucatán, by Scott Smith

Music

Groups and labels
Ruin (American band), an American thrash metal band
Ruins (Australian band), an Australian black metal band
Ruins (Italian band)
Ruins (Japanese band), a Japanese drum-bass duo
Ruin (punk band), an American punk band

Albums
Ruin (album), a 2007 album by British metal band Architects
Ruins (Dread Zeppelin album), 1996
Ruins (Grouper album), 2014
 Ruins, a 2016 album by British psychedelic rock band Wolf People
 Ruins, a 2018 album by Swedish country folk duo First Aid Kit

Songs
"Ruins" (instrumental), by Henry Cow
"Ruins", a song by English folk rock, singer-songwriter Cat Stevens
"Ruins", a song by Australian singer Gabriella Cilmi
"Ruins", a track from the soundtrack of the 2015 video game Undertale by Toby Fox
"Ruin", a song by Squarepusher from Music Is Rotted One Note

Other uses in arts, entertainment, and media
Ruin (publishing house), a Swedish publishing house and magazine
Ruin (video game), a video game from SCE and Idol Minds cancelled mid-development
Ruin, a.k.a. Professor Hamilton, a DC supervillain in Superman comics
Ruins (comics), a 1995 comic book published by Marvel, written by Warren Ellis
Real World/Road Rules Challenge: The Ruins, season 18 of the MTV reality TV game show

See also
Runes, letters of the Runic alphabets